S33005 is a serotonin–norepinephrine reuptake inhibitor (SNRI) that was under development by Servier for the treatment of depression and related disorders. It is structurally related to venlafaxine but has a more complex molecular structure.  Venlafaxine appears to be a sigma modulator, but it is not known if S33005 shares this activity.

Synthesis
"The 1-cyano-benzocyclobutenes used as starting material are obtained, for example, by subjecting a β-[orthohalogeno-phenyl]-propionitrile to intramolecular condensation in the presence of potassium amide, or by brominating a benzocyclobutene in position 1 with N-bromosuccinimide, followed by exchange of the bromine atom for a cyano group by means of sodium cyanide."

See also 
 Milnacipran

References

External links 
 PubMed search
 Binding Database
 The patent and synthesis discussion can be found in 

Tertiary alcohols
Antidepressants
Benzocyclobutenes
Phenol ethers
Serotonin–norepinephrine reuptake inhibitors
Sigma agonists